Creysse is the name of 2 communes in France:

 Creysse, in the Dordogne department
 Creysse, in the Lot department